The qualification event of the 2013 World Wheelchair Curling Championship was held from November 3 to 8, 2012 at the Kisakallio Sports Institute in Lohja, Finland, which hosted the qualification tournaments for the past two World Wheelchair Curling Championships. The qualification event was open to any World Curling Federation affiliated national team not already qualified. The event's two top finishers, Norway and Finland, will join the top 8 finishers from the last World Wheelchair Curling Championship at this season's event in Sochi, Russia.

Of the 11 teams that competed, Italy and Norway last competed at the Worlds in 2012, Germany and the Czech Republic in 2011, Switzerland in 2009, Japan in 2008, Denmark in 2007, and Poland in 2005. Finland, Latvia and Turkey never appeared at a World Wheelchair Curling Championship prior to this season, and Turkey made its debut on the world wheelchair curling stage at the qualification event.

After the round robin, Finland, Norway, Italy, and Latvia advanced to the playoffs, where Finland played Norway for a spot in the World Championships and Italy played Latvia for a spot in the second qualifier. Norway, skipped by Rune Lorentsen, defeated Finland, skipped by Vesa Hellman, with a score of 8–3 to grab the first of two open spots in the World Championships. Finland was relegated to the second qualifier, while Italy, skipped by Paolo Ioriatti, defeated Latvia, skipped by Ojārs Briedis, with a score of 7–4 to advance to the second qualifier. In the Second Place Game, Finland defeated Italy with a score of 9–7 to claim the second spot in the World Championships.

Teams
The teams are listed as follows:

Round-robin standings
Final round-robin standings

Round-robin results
All draw times listed in Eastern European Time (UTC+2).

Draw 1
Saturday, November 3, 16:00

Draw 2
Sunday, November 4, 9:30

Draw 3
Sunday, November 4, 14:00

Draw 4
Sunday, November 4, 18:30

Draw 5
Monday, November 5, 10:30

Draw 6
Monday, November 5, 16:30

Draw 7
Tuesday, November 6, 9:30

Draw 8
Tuesday, November 6, 14:00

Draw 9
Tuesday, November 6, 18:30

Draw 10
Wednesday, November 7, 9:30

Draw 11
Wednesday, November 7, 14:00

Playoffs

1 vs. 2
Thursday, November 8, 12:00

 is qualified to participate in the Worlds
 moves to Second Place Game

3 vs. 4
Thursday, November 8, 12:00

 advances to Second Place Game

Second Place Game
Thursday, November 8, 16:30

 qualified to participate in the Worlds

References
General

Specific

External links

Results from the Finnish Curling Association

2012 in curling
World Wheelchair Curling Championship
Qualification for curling competitions